Ruslan Abuevich Akhtakhanov (1953 – 16 November 2011) was a Chechen poet and academic.

Early life
Akhtakhanov was born in Znamenskoye, Chechen Republic.

Career and views
Akhtakhanov was a professor and vice-rector at the Modern Humanitarian Academy in Moscow and a poet. He was an outspoken opponent of Chechen separatism and a supporter of Chechnya's president Ramzan Kadyrov.

He was a member of the Russian Union of Writers.

Death and burial
Akhtakhanov was shot and killed in Moscow in 2011 by an unknown assailant. He was 58. His body was buried in his hometown, Znamenskoye, on 17 November 2011.

References

1950s births
2011 deaths
Chechen poets
Academics from Moscow
Assassinated Chechen people
People murdered in Russia
Deaths by firearm in Russia
20th-century Russian poets
1953 births